Songs of Chelsea is a 1988 studio album by Blossom Dearie.

Track listing
"My Attorney Bernie" (Dave Frishberg)
"Ev'rything I've Got" (music: Richard Rodgers; lyrics: Lorenz Hart) 	
"C'est le printemps" (music: Richard Rodgers; lyrics: Jean Sablon)
"When in Rome" (music: Cy Coleman; lyrics: Carolyn Leigh) 	
"Let the Flower Grow" (Jay Leonhart)
"My New Celebrity Is You" (Johnny Mercer)
"What Time Is It Now" (music: Blossom Dearie; lyrics: Jack Segal)
"You Fascinate Me So" (music: Cy Coleman; lyrics: Carolyn Leigh)
"Moonlight Saving Time" (Irving Kahal, Harry Richman)
"Chelsea Aire" (Walter Birchett, Dearie)

Personnel
Blossom Dearie – piano, vocals
Bob Cranshaw – double bass
Jay Berliner – guitar

References

1988 albums
Blossom Dearie albums
Daffodil Records albums
Cool jazz albums